Mariko Tamaki (born 1975) is a Canadian artist and writer. She is known for her graphic novels Skim, Emiko Superstar, and This One Summer, and for several prose works of fiction and non-fiction. In 2016 she began writing for both Marvel and DC Comics. She has twice been named a runner-up for the Michael L. Printz Award.

Early life
Mariko Tamaki was born in Toronto, Ontario. She is of Japanese and Jewish descent.

Mariko attended Havergal College, an all girls' secondary school. She studied English literature at McGill University, graduating in 1994.

Career
Tamaki has worked as a writer and performance artist in Toronto, including with Keith Cole's Cheap Queers and in the performance group Pretty Porky & Pissed Off with Joanne Huffa, Allyson Mitchell, Abi Slone, Tracy Tidgwell and Zoe Whittall.

Tamaki published the novel Cover Me in 2000. It is a "poignant story about an adolescent coping with depression". Told in a series of flashbacks, it is about a teenager dealing with cutting and feeling like an outsider in school.

Skim, a collaboration with her cousin Jillian Tamaki, published in 2008 by Groundwood Books, is a graphic novel about a teenage girl and her romantic feelings towards her female teacher; the reciprocity of those feelings remains unclear in the text. The other central story is about the suicide of a classmate's ex-boyfriend who may have been gay. The text is fundamentally "about living in the moments of wrenching transition ...[and] the conflicting need to belong and desire to resist". Tamaki says she did not set out to "make a statement about queerness and youth": "Skim's in love, and kisses a woman, but heck, she's just a kid. She could go on to kiss many people in her future - some of them might be dudes, who knows? I think Skim is more a statement about youth, and the variety of strange experiences that can encapsulate." According to one reviewer, "the expressionistic fluidity of the black and white illustrations serves the purpose of pages of prose"; there is little plot and spare dialogue. Tamaki writes that artists such as Hergé, Igort and Vittorio Giardino as well as Asian art had an influence on her style but her storytelling was rooted in American comics like Daniel Clowes, Chester Brown, and Will Eisner. Skim was originally developed as a short play for Nightwood Theatre.

Emiko Superstar, Tamaki's second graphic novel and first with illustrator Steve Rolston, is about a young woman who feels trapped in her suburban life. It was inspired by performance art and Girlspit, an open mic night event in Montreal. The protagonist is inspired to try performance art after visiting such a space. As one review says, "this is a story about finding oneself, one's voice, and one's true character amidst the trappings of counter-culture fame".

Tamaki performed at experimental feminist performance art festival Edgy Women in Montreal twice in 2006 and 2010.

In 2014 Tamaki again collaborated with Jillian Tamaki, on the graphic novel This One Summer, published by Groundwood Books.

In 2016 it was announced that Tamaki would be writing a new Hulk series starring She-Hulk for Marvel Comics, and the mini-series Supergirl: Being Super for DC Comics.

In 2017 she began writing novel adaptations of the Lumberjanes comic series.

Tamaki's graphic novel collaboration with artist Rosemary Valero-O'Connell, Laura Dean Keeps Breaking Up with Me was released in May 2019 by First Second Books. Freddy's rocky relationship with Laura leaves her heartbroken and neglectful of her true friends. In this queer coming-of-age story, Freddy learns to let go of a toxic relationship and value the people in her life who make her a better person.

In November 2019, Tamaki came back to Marvel for a four-part mini-series called "Spider-Man & Venom: Double Trouble".

Tamaki's graphic novel I Am Not Starfire was released on 10 August 2021 as part of the YA original graphic novel series from DC Comics. Yoshi Yoshitani provided art for the standalone story, which centers Teen Titans legend Starfire's daughter Mandy Koriand'r, who plans on "moving to France to escape the family spotlight and not go to college" despite her famous mother's protestations.

In January 2021, as part of DC's Future State event, Tamaki and artist Dan Mora collaborated on Dark Detective with colors by Jordie Bellaire. The series ran for four issues from January to February. In March, Tamaki, Mora, and Bellaire became the new creative team for Detective Comics beginning with #1034. According to Comic Book Resources (CBR), Tamaki's appointment as the writer of Detective Comics makes her the first female lead-writer of the title's publication history.

Awards
Skim won an Ignatz Award, a Joe Shuster Award and a Doug Wright Award in 2009, and was a nominee for the "Children's literature (text)" category at the 2008 Governor General's Awards. Tamaki was also awarded an Honour of Distinction by the Dayne Ogilvie Prize, a literary award for lesbian, gay, bisexual or transgender writers in Canada, in 2012. This One Summer, illustrated by Jillian Tamaki, was nominated for a 2014 Ignatz Award, and won the 2015 Michael L. Printz Award and a Caldecott Honor from the American Library Association. In 2016 she won the German Rudolph-Dirks-Award in the category Youth Drama / Coming of Age (for This One Summer). In 2019, Laura Dean Keeps Breaking Up With Me won the Ignatz Award for Outstanding Graphic Novel as well as the Best Children's or Young Adult Book Award from the Harvey Awards. Laura Dean Keeps Breaking Up With Me was also awarded the 2020 Walter Award in the Teen Category, and received the Eisner Award for Best Publication for Teens for Laura Dean Keeps Breaking Up With Me and Eisner Award for Best Writer, by Harley Quinn: Breaking Glass (DC); Laura Dean Keeps Breaking Up with Me (First Second/Macmillan) e Archie (Archie).

Works
Cover Me (2000)
True Lies: The Book of Bad Advice (2002)
Fake ID (2005)
Skim, with Jillian Tamaki (2008)
Emiko Superstar, with Steve Rolston (2008)
(You) Set Me on Fire (2012)
This One Summer, with Jillian Tamaki (2014)
Tomb Raider (2016)
Saving Montgomery Sole (2016)
Supergirl: Being Super (2016-2017)
X-23 (2018)
Laura Dean Keeps Breaking Up with Me, illustrated by Rosemary Valero-O'Connell (2019)
Harley Quinn: Breaking Glass, illustrated by Steve Pugh (2019)
Spider-Man & Venom: Double Trouble (2020)
Thor & Loki: Double Trouble (2021)
Dark Detective, #1-4, illustrated by Dan Mora (2021)
I am Not Starfire, illustrated by Yoshi Yoshitani (2021)
Anne of Greenville (2022)

Lumberjanes novels, all illustrated by Brooklyn Allen

 Unicorn Power! (2017)
 The Moon is Up (2018)
 The Good Egg (2018)
 Ghost Cabin (2019)

She-Hulk

 Volume 1: Deconstructed (2017)
 Volume 2: Let Them Eat Cake (2018)
 Volume 3: Jen Walters Must Die (2018)

References

External links

  
 
 

1975 births
21st-century Canadian dramatists and playwrights
21st-century Canadian novelists
21st-century Canadian short story writers
21st-century Canadian women writers
21st-century Canadian essayists
Artists from Toronto
Canadian graphic novelists
Canadian people of Japanese descent
Canadian performance artists
Women performance artists
Canadian women artists
Canadian women dramatists and playwrights
Canadian women essayists
Canadian women novelists
Canadian women short story writers
Canadian writers of Asian descent
Canadian writers of young adult literature
Female comics writers
Havergal College alumni
Jewish Canadian writers
LGBT comics creators
Canadian LGBT dramatists and playwrights
Canadian LGBT novelists
Marvel Comics people
Marvel Comics writers
DC Comics people
Living people
McGill University alumni
Michael L. Printz Award winners
Women writers of young adult literature
Writers from Toronto
Eisner Award winners for Best Writer
Queer dramatists and playwrights
Queer novelists
21st-century Canadian LGBT people